Bhupendra Nath Kaushik (7 July 1924 – 27 October 2007) was a Hindi and Urdu language poet, writer and satirist.

He was born in Nahan, Himachal Pradesh. He completed basic study in Ambala Cantt Haryana. After that he settled in Jabalpur, Madhya Pradesh and completed an M.A. in English.  He was an employee of BSNL. After pursuing writing along with his service for some time, he became well known as an Urdu story writer.  But when he was settled in Jabalpur, he did write poetry in Hindi.

He won the "Sahitya Maneeshi alankaran" in 2005 for his satire, "Koltar Mai Aks" [कोलतार मैं अक्स].

Major works

Urdu poetry
 Maa
 Rahat
 Desh ki jawani
 Bhonk
 Chor

Hindi Poetry
 Naya Prazatantra
 Kutta
 Bhushe Ka Dher
 Yun ud gaya
 Chalo Chal chalain

References

 Hindi Wikipedia of bhupendra nath kaushik

External links

 Interview bhupendra nath kaushik

1924 births
2007 deaths
Hindi-language poets
Urdu-language poets from India
People from Jabalpur
20th-century Indian poets
Indian male poets
Poets from Himachal Pradesh
20th-century Indian male writers